Idrio Bui (14 June 1932 – 15 December 2022) was an Italian racing cyclist. He raced professionally from 1957 to 1964.

Awards

Amateur
Winner of the Coppa Sabatini (1956)

Professional

References

1932 births
2022 deaths
Italian male cyclists
People from Sinalunga